The Zubi Shiyi Mai Jiujing, or Cauterization Canon of the Eleven Vessels of the Foot and Forearm, is an ancient Chinese medical text that was excavated in 1973 from a tomb in Mawangdui Han tombs site that was sealed in 168 BCE, under the Han Dynasty. It was handcopied in seal script around 215 BCE, under the Qin Dynasty, on the same sheet of silk as a longer medical text called Recipes for Fifty-Two Ailments. The Cauterization Canon describes the path of eleven vessels or channels (mai ) inside the body and explains how to perform cauterization to treat the ailments associated with each vessel.

See also
Yin Yang Shiyi Mai Jiujing
Wushi'er Bingfang

Notes

Bibliography

.

Chinese medical texts
History of ancient medicine
Medical manuals